Giuseppe d'Annibale (22 September 1815 – 18 July 1892) was an Italian cardinal and theologian.

He was appointed professor in the Seminary of Rieti and later vicar-general of the diocese. He was preconized Titular Bishop of Caryste by Pope Leo XIII on 12 August 1881, was created Cardinal-Priest of Santi Bonifacio e Alessio on 11 February 1889, and became Prefect of the Congregation for Indulgences and Sacred Relics. His treatise on moral theology is entitled "Summula theologiae moralis" (Milan, 1881–1883). Another work, a commentary on the Constitution "Apostolicae Sedis" (Rieti, 1880), is also valuable to theologians and canonists.

1815 births
1892 deaths
Italian Roman Catholic titular bishops
19th-century Italian cardinals
Cardinals created by Pope Leo XIII